2C-V is a recreational designer drug from the substituted phenethylamine family, with psychedelic effects. It was first synthesised by Daniel Trachsel and colleagues in 2006. It is active at a dosage of 25 mg with a duration of around 5 hours.

See also 
 2C-AL
 2C-CP
 2C-E
 2C-YN

References 

Designer drugs
Psychedelic phenethylamines
Serotonin receptor agonists
Methoxy compounds
Vinyl compounds